Tonga competed at the 1996 Summer Olympics in Atlanta, United States.  The nation won its first ever Olympic medal at these Games.

Medalists

Athletics

Men
Track & road events

Women
Field events

Boxing

Men

Weightlifting

Men

References
Official Olympic Reports
International Olympic Committee results database

Nations at the 1996 Summer Olympics
1996
1996 in Tongan sport